The 2013 WNBA Finals was the playoff series for the 2013 season of the Women's National Basketball Association (WNBA), and the conclusion of the season's playoffs. The Minnesota Lynx, champions of the Western Conference, defeated the Atlanta Dream, champions of the Eastern Conference.

The WNBA Finals were under a 2–2–1 rotation. The Lynx held home-court advantage as they had a better regular season record (26–8) than the Dream (17–17). The meeting is a rematch of the  2011 WNBA Finals, in which the Lynx defeated the Dream in three games.

The Lynx won the first game of the series 84–59, and the second 88–63. They finished the sweep with an 86–77 win in Atlanta, becoming the second WNBA team to sweep through the playoffs since the best-of-five finals format was adopted.

Background

2013 WNBA regular season

2013 WNBA Playoffs

Atlanta Dream

The Atlanta Dream finished 17-17, good for second place in the Eastern Conference. They defeated the Washington Mystics in three games in the conference semifinals, and swept fourth-seeded Indiana, the defending WNBA champions, who had upset the top seed, the Chicago Sky, in the first round.

The Dream featured Angel McCoughtry, who won her second consecutive scoring title in 2013, as well as Brazilian center Erika de Souza. However, the Dream played the Finals without Sancho Lyttle, who had gone down with an injury during the season.

Minnesota Lynx

The Minnesota Lynx finished with the best record in the WNBA for the third straight year.. The Lynx swept both fourth-seeded Seattle and pre-season favorites Phoenix to win their third consecutive Western Conference crown.

The Lynx returned their core nucleus of Seimone Augustus, Rebekkah Brunson, Maya Moore, and Lindsay Whalen, all of whom played on the Lynx's 2011 championship team.

Regular-season series
The season series was tied, 1-1:

Series summary
All times are in Eastern Daylight Time (UTC−4).

Game 1
The Minnesota Lynx came out determined not to lose game one at home as they had in the 2012 WNBA Finals. Maya Moore led the Lynx with 23 points, and Monica Wright added 20 off the bench as the Lynx cruised past the dream 84-59. Angel McCoughtry led the Dream with 17 points.

Game 2
The Lynx came out on fire in Game 2, opening up an 11-point lead after the first quarter that they would never relinquish. Seimone Augustus led the Lynx in scoring with 20 points, and all five starters finished the game in double figures. Angel McCoughtry was hampered by foul trouble throughout the night, and ultimately fouled out in the fourth quarter.

Game 3
The Lynx opened up an 8-point lead at the end of the first quarter, but Atlanta battled back several times, cutting the lead to 3 at halftime. Ultimately, however, the balanced attack of Minnesota was simply too much for the Dream to overcome; the Lynx won 86–77, earning their second WNBA title in three years, and becoming the second WNBA team to sweep the playoffs. Maya Moore of the Lynx was named WNBA Finals MVP.

Rosters

References

Finals
Women's National Basketball Association Finals
WNBA Finals
WNBA Finals
October 2013 sports events in the United States
Minnesota Lynx
Atlanta Dream
2010s in Minneapolis
Basketball competitions in Minneapolis
Events in Duluth, Georgia
Basketball competitions in Georgia (U.S. state)